The Maldivian rufiyaa (sign: Rf or ; code: MVR) is the currency of the Maldives. The issuance of the currency is controlled by the Maldives Monetary Authority (MMA). The most commonly used symbols for the rufiyaa are MVR and Rf. The ISO 4217 code for Maldivian rufiyaa is MVR. The rufiyaa is subdivided into 100 laari.

The name "rufiyaa" is derived from the Sanskrit रूप्य (rūpya, wrought silver). The midpoint of exchange rate is Rf. 12/85 per US dollar and the rate is permitted to fluctuate within a ±20% band, i.e. between Rf. 10/28 and Rf. 15/42 as of 10 April 2017.

History

The earliest form of currency used in the Maldives was cowrie shells (Cypraea moneta) and historical accounts of travellers indicate that they were traded in this manner even during the 13th century. As late as 1344, Ibn Batuta observed that more than 40 ships loaded with cowry shells were exported each year. A single gold dinar was worth 400,000 shells. 

During the 17th and 18th centuries, lārin (parallel straps of silver wire folded in half with dyed Persian and Arabic inscriptions) were imported and traded as currency. This form of currency was used in the Persian Gulf, India, Ceylon and the Far East during this time. Historians agree that this new form of currency was most probably exchanged for cowry shells and indicates Maldives' lucrative trade with these countries. The first Sultan to imprint his own seal onto this currency was Ghaazee Mohamed Thakurufaanu Al Auzam. The seal was much broader than the wires hence it was barely legible.

The first known of coins were introduced by Sultan Ibrahim Iskandar (1648–1687). Compared to the previous forms of money, these coins were much neater and minted in pure silver. The coins were minted in the capital city of Malé, a fact which it acknowledged on the reverse. The legend "King of Land and Sea, Iskandhar the Great" is found on the edge.

After this period, gold coins replaced the existing silver ones during the reign of Sultan Hassan Nooruddin in 1787. He used two different qualities of gold in his coins; one was called Mohoree and the other Baimohoree, of which the former is of higher value. How this gold was obtained is uncertain.

Throughout the nineteenth and early twentieth centuries, bronze coins were issued denominated in laari. Sultan Mohamed Imaadhudheen IV (1900–1904) introduced what historians believe to be the first machine struck coins, judging the superior quality of the engravements. His successor Sultan Mohamed Shamshudeen III (1904–1935) made the last of these coins, 1 and 4 laari denominations, which were struck in the United Kingdom by Heaton's Mint, Birmingham, England in 1913.

Following the end of coin production specifically for the Maldives, the Sultanate came to use the Ceylonese rupee. This was supplemented in 1947 by issues of banknotes denominated in rufiyaa, equal in value to the rupee. In 1960, coins denominated in laari, now worth one hundredth of the rufiyaa, were introduced.

Coins

In early 1960, Sultan Mohamed Fareed I ordered coins from the Royal Mint in England. The new issue consisted of denominations of 1, 2, 5, 10, 25 and 50 laari. Unlike his predecessors, Sultan Fareed did not embellish his title on the coins; instead he used the National Emblem on the reverse side with the traditional title of the state (State of Maldives) and the denomination value on the obverse side. The currency was put into circulation in February 1961 and all the previously traded coins, with the exception of Shamshudeen III's 1 and 4 laari, were withdrawn from circulation on 17 June 1966.

The newly established central bank, the Maldives Monetary Authority (MMA), introduced the Rf. 1/- coin on 22 January 1983. The coin was made from steel clad copper nickel  and was minted in West Germany. In 1984, a new series of coins was introduced which did not include the 2 laari denomination. In 1995, Rf. 2/- coins were introduced. Coins currently in circulation are 1 laari, 2 laari, 5 laari, 10 laari, 25 laari, 50 laari, Rf. 1/-, Rf. 2/-.

Banknotes

In 1945, the Majlis of the Maldives (Parliament) passed bill number 2/66 on the "Maldivian Bank Note". Under this law, banknotes for Rf. , Rf. 1/-, Rf. 2/-, Rf. 5/- and Rf. 10/- were printed and put into circulation on 5 September 1948. In 1951, Rf. 50/- and Rf. 100/- banknotes were introduced.

The current series of banknotes was issued in 1983 in denominations of Rf. 2/-, Rf. 5/-, Rf. 10/-, Rf. 20/-, Rf. 50/- and Rf. 100/-. Rf. 500/- banknotes were added in 1990, with the Rf. 2/- replaced by a coin in 1995.

In October 2015, the Maldives Monetary Authority issued a Rf. 5,000/- banknote in polymer to commemorate the 50th anniversary of independence, and issued a new family of banknotes in polymer that included a new denomination of Rf. 1,000/-. A Rf. 5/- banknote printed in polymer was revealed in May 2017 and was issued in July 2017. It was originally planned that this denomination was to be replaced by a coin of the same denomination, but public input convinced the Maldives Monetary Authority to go for the banknote.

Illustrations on the banknotes were done by Maizan Hassan Manik and Abbaas (Bamboo).

See also
 Currency of Maldives
 Economy of Maldives
Maldives Banknote Collection (1947-2018)

References

 MMA (Dhivehi) Publication, 1983.   (Maldivian Currency)

External links
 Currency in Circulation, Maldives Monetary Authority
Maldives Rufiyaa Collection (1947–2018)
 Official Exchange Rates
 Banknotes of the Maldives

Currencies of the British Empire
Currencies of the Commonwealth of Nations
Currencies of the Maldives
Economy of the Maldives
Fixed exchange rate
Currencies introduced in 1947